The crimson-backed flameback or greater Sri Lanka flameback (Chrysocolaptes stricklandi) is a species of bird in the woodpecker family Picidae that is endemic to Sri Lanka.

The crimson-backed flameback and the greater flameback (Chrysocolaptes guttacristatus) were both formerly considered as subspecies of the buff-spotted flameback (Chrysocolaptes lucidus).

References

crimson-backed flameback
Birds of Sri Lanka
crimson-backed flameback